The Jamaica Police Federation is a union representing police officers in Jamaica from the ranks of Constable through to Inspector.

External links
 Jamaica Police Federation Official site

Law of Jamaica